The 2011–12 season was the 111th season in Athletic Bilbao's history and their 81st consecutive season in La Liga, the top division of Spanish football.  It covers a period from 1 July 2011 to 30 June 2012.

Athletic Bilbao competed for their ninth La Liga title and participated in the UEFA Europa League, entering in the play-off round due to their sixth-place finish in the 2010–11 La Liga. They also entered the Copa del Rey in the Round of 32.

Players

Squad information

Transfers

In

Total expenditure:  €0 million

Out

 
Total income:  €0 million

Club

Coaching staff

La Liga

League table

Results by round

Matches

Copa del Rey

Round of 32

Round of 16

Quarter-finals

Semi-finals

Final

UEFA Europa League

Play-off round

Group stage

Knockout phase

Round of 32

Round of 16

Quarter-finals

Semi-finals

Final

See also
2011–12 La Liga
2011–12 Copa del Rey
2011–12 UEFA Europa League

References

External links
 

Athletic Bilbao
Athletic Bilbao seasons
Athletic Bilbao